Ornela Kapetani (born 19 June 1979) is an Albanian actress. Kapetani's film credits include the Albanian film Daybreak and the Greek films The Daughter and Correction.

External links
 

Albanian actresses
Albanian film actresses
Living people
People from Sarandë
1979 births